Sir George Coutts Ligertwood (1888–1967), commonly referred to as G. C. Ligertwood, was a Judge of the Supreme Court of South Australia (12 July 1945–14 October 1958).

Early life and education
Ligertwood was born on 15 October 1888, a son of William Leith Ligertwood of Maylands, a suburb of Adelaide, South Australia. He was educated at Norwood Public school, followed by the Grote Street Pupil Teachers' School (became Adelaide High School), where he won an exhibition for three years at the University of Adelaide. He graduated BA in 1908 and LLB in 1910, winning the Stow prize in three consecutive years, thus securing a Stow Scholarship, and David Murray Scholarship in Private International Law, serving his articles with his uncle J. R. Anderson, KC.

Career

Public service
Ligertwood was admitted to the Bar on 15 December 1910, and the following year was appointed by Chief Justice Sir Samuel Way as his associate, succeeding Mjr. W. L. Stuart, who had accepted the position of solicitor to the Land Titles Office.
In February 1914 Way was appointed Lieut. Governor for the duration of Sir Day Bosanquet's absence from the State (he never returned and was succeeded by Henry Galway), and chose Ligertwood to be his private secretary.
Ligertwood was on 1 September 1915 appointed acting master of the Supreme Court during the absence of Mjr. Stuart on military duties. At the end of the year he left the public service for private practice.

Military and legal career
Early in 1918 he joined the law firm of Stock & Bennett and on 6 May 1918 enlisted in the Australian Imperial Force, returning to South Australia in 1919 to become a partner in the firm Baker, McEwin, Ligertwood and Millhouse. He was appointed as a King's Counsel on 28 August 1930.

He served as the President of the Law Society of South Australia from 1935 to 1937 and again from 1941 to 1943. He was a member of the executive-committee of the Law Council of Australia in 1937 and in 1942–43 and served as a vice-president in 1937.

Judicial career

Ligertwood served on the bench of the Supreme Court from 12 July 1945 until his retirement in 1958. The Federal government appointed him to three royal commissions. In 1945, he was appointed Royal Commissioner by Prime Minister Ben Chifley to look into the conduct of Lieutenant General Gordon Bennett; in 1949, he took part in a commission into timber-leases in New Guinea; finally, in 1954–55 he was one of three commissioners who examined espionage in Australia.

Other roles

From 1930–67, Ligertwood served as a governor of Scotch College, Adelaide. He held the following roles at the University of Adelaide:
Examiner in wrongs (1913–15);
Examiner in property (1917 and 1919–26);
Member of council from 1942;
Warden of the senate (1945–59);
Deputy-chancellor (1958–61);
Chancellor (1961–66);
Chairman of the planning committee for the Flinders University of South Australia (founded 1966)
Patron of the Adelaide University Football Club (1966).

Personal life

Ligertwood married Edith Emily Naismith at the Methodist Church, Upper Sturt on 6 April 1915. They had four children:
William Leith Ligertwood (1916–1942)
Helen Ligertwood (1917– )
Neil Coutts Ligertwood (1920–1990)
Marion Jean Ligertwood (1927– )

He became a member of the Adelaide Club in 1929, and was a prominent Freemason.

Ligertwood died on 13 October 1967, in Adelaide.

Honours

Ligertwood was knighted in 1956. In 1959, he was appointed royal commissioner by the Western Australian government to inquire into betting. He chaired the Federal committee on taxation (1959–61), and the South Australian committee on assessment for land tax (1962–64).

He received an honorary LL.D. from the University of Western Australia in 1963, and another from the University of Adelaide in 1964.

References

"Ligertwood, Sir George Coutts (1888 - 1967)", Australian Dictionary of Biography

1888 births
1967 deaths
Australian King's Counsel
Chancellors of the University of Adelaide
Judges of the Supreme Court of South Australia
People from Adelaide
20th-century King's Counsel
Adelaide Law School alumni
Adelaide Club
People educated at Adelaide High School
Military personnel from South Australia
Australian military personnel of World War I
Australian Knights Bachelor